The El Salvador national beach soccer team represents El Salvador in international beach soccer competitions and is controlled by the FESFUT, the governing body for football in El Salvador.

Compared to their national association football team counterparts, they are considerable force in the sport both continently and internationally.

History
The team's first qualification attempt for the Beach Soccer World Cup came in 2007, when they joined Mexico, Costa Rica and the United States in the CONCACAF Beach Soccer Championship. They failed to win a game and ultimately finished last.

In April 2008, the team again participated in the CONCACAF Beach Soccer Championship. Although they lost their opening game 4–2 to Mexico, they went on to defeat raining CONCACAF and CONMEBOL champions, the United States (5–6) and Costa Rica (3–4), to finish second in the group; this allowed them to qualify for, along with Mexico, the 2008 FIFA Beach Soccer World Cup which was held in France. Adding to the group's achievements, two of its players also picked up individual awards, with Luis Rodas being named Goalkeeper of the Tournament, and José Ruiz winning the Golden Boot for scoring the most goals (six in total).

In June 2009, the team took part at the 2009 CONCACAF Beach Soccer Championship. The team reached the final after defeating the United States in the semi-final round. They faced Costa Rica in the final who had defeated reigning champions Mexico in the other semi-final match. El Salvador, contesting their second final, defeated Costa Rica 6–3. Individual awards were given to José Portillo, who was named Goalkeeper of the Tournament, and José Ruiz, who won the Golden Boot a second time, shooting eight goals out of four matches.

Results and fixtures

The following is a list of match results in the last 12 months, as well as any future matches that have been scheduled.

Legend

2021

Coaching staff

Current coaching staff
Assistant Manager: Ramón Arturo Muñoz
Physical Coordinator: Elmer Edgardo Guidos
Medical Trainer: Francisco Amaya Cruz

Goalkeeper Trainer: Raúl Antonio García
Utilizer: Alex Geovanny Galdámez

Managerial history

 Rudis González Gallo (????–)

Players

Current squad
The following players and staff members were called up for the 2021 FIFA Beach Soccer World Cup.

Head coach: Rudis Mauricio Gonzalez
Assistant coach: Elias Alexander Ramirez
Goalkeeping coach: Jose Alberto Lovato

Competitive record

FIFA Beach Soccer World Cup

World Beach Games

Central American and Caribbean Games

Central American and Caribbean Beach Games

References

External links
El Salvador at FIFA
El Salvador at BSWW
El Salvador at Beach Soccer Russia

North American national beach soccer teams
Beach soccer